Pak may refer to either of these two languages:
 one of the names (better spelled Päk) given to the Lemerig language 
 the Pak-Tong language

See also 
 Languages of Pakistan